Eleanor Young Love (1922–2006) was an African-American librarian from Kentucky. She was the daughter of Whitney Young and the sister of Whitney Young, Jr.  She worked at the Lincoln Institute., an all-black boarding high school in Lincoln Ridge, KY, formed when schools were segregated in Kentucky. , where her father was president. She received her degree from Atlanta University, now Clark Atlanta University,  her M.Ed. from the University of Louisville, and her D. Ed. from the University of Illinois.

Early life and education 
Eleanor Young was born in Shelby County, KY, on October 10, 1922, to Whitney Young and Laura (Ray) Young. She was the brother of Whitney Young Jr. and Arnita Young. Arnita was an influential social worker in Chicago and has a park named after her. Her mother was one of the first African American female postmaster generals in America. Her father was head of the Lincoln Institute, where she was born.  All the faculty lived on site, so she lived there for her entire childhood.  Kentucky was segregated at the time and many Kentucky counties had no black high schools, so many black families sent their children to Lincoln Institute. It was originally funded by an anonymous benefactor, but then the counties began to pay for the students to attend so it became public. She attended Lincoln Normal School for elementary school and then back to Lincoln Institute for high school. She was very involved in her church, spending almost as much time in church as in school, so she had a strict religious upbringing. Young attended Kentucky State University where she was very active in student organizations and organizing. She started several clubs and created many community service projects, taking on leadership roles in many cases.  She also worked her way through school.  She majored in English and worked at the library. She took a scholarship to Atlanta University in Library Science and took what was then a Bachelors in Library Science.  She also received a Masters of Education degree from the University of Louisville. She received her Doctorate at the University of Illinois at Urbana, and worked part-time in Chicago.

Career and later life 
Love worked as a librarian at Lincoln Institute and Florida A&M University, before becoming head librarian at Bergen Junior College of Fairleigh Dickinson University. In 1955, she became the first African American librarian at the University of Kentucky. She became a professor of Educational Psychology at the University of Louisville in the 1960's, where she participated in an oral history interview in 1978. She also took over for her father as head of the Lincoln Institute before it was transformed into the Whitney Young Job Corps Center in the late 1960's, as a result of desegregation. She became Dean of the College of Arts and Sciences of the University of Louisville, becoming the first African-American dean. She received many awards including 2 Governor's Appreciation Citations, named a Kentucky Colonel (Kentucky's highest honor) by 2 governors, the Urban League's Equality Award, NAACP Worthington Award twice, University of Louisville Minority Affairs award twice, the YMCA Black Achievers award, the Kentucky State University Outstanding Achievers award,   and was the chairwoman of the Human Relations Commission for Louisville and Jefferson County, and was a mentor to hundreds of young people in the community. There is a scholarship named for her at the University of Louisville, for students studying school counseling, as well as a humanitarian award sponsored by the city of Louisville. She died on July 14, 2006, in Kentucky.

References

External links 
 Interview Highlights, Eleanor Young Love, Sister of Whitney Young Jr.

1922 births
2006 deaths
People from Shelby County, Kentucky
African-American librarians
American women librarians
American librarians
Atlanta University alumni
University of Louisville alumni
University of Illinois Urbana-Champaign alumni
University of Louisville faculty
20th-century African-American people
21st-century African-American people
20th-century African-American women
21st-century African-American women